Sulfide (British English also sulphide) is an inorganic anion of sulfur with the chemical formula S2− or a compound containing one or more S2− ions.  Solutions of sulfide salts are corrosive. Sulfide also refers to chemical compounds large families of inorganic and organic compounds, e.g. lead sulfide and dimethyl sulfide. Hydrogen sulfide (H2S) and bisulfide (SH−) are the conjugate acids of sulfide.

Chemical properties 
The sulfide ion, S2−, does not exist in aqueous alkaline  solutions of Na2S.  Instead sulfide converts to hydrosulfide:
S2− +  H2O  →  SH− +  OH−

Upon treatment with an acid, sulfide salts convert to hydrogen sulfide:
S2− + H+  →  SH−
SH− + H+  → H2S

Oxidation of sulfide is a complicated process. Depending on the conditions, the oxidation can produce elemental sulfur, polysulfides, polythionates, sulfite, or sulfate. Metal sulfides react with halogens, forming sulfur and metal salts.
8 MgS + 8 I2 → S8 + 8 MgI2

Metal derivatives
Aqueous solutions of transition metals cations react with sulfide sources (H2S, NaHS, Na2S) to precipitate solid sulfides.  Such inorganic sulfides typically have very low solubility in water, and many are related to minerals with the same composition (see below).  One famous example is the bright yellow species CdS or "cadmium yellow".  The black tarnish formed on sterling silver is Ag2S.  Such species are sometimes referred to as salts.  In fact, the bonding in transition metal sulfides is highly covalent, which gives rise to their semiconductor properties, which in turn is related to the deep colors.  Several have practical applications as pigments, in solar cells, and as catalysts. The fungus Aspergillus niger plays a role in the solubilization of heavy metal sulfides.

Geology

Many important metal ores are sulfides. Significant examples include: argentite (silver sulfide), cinnabar (mercury sulfide), galena (lead sulfide),  molybdenite (molybdenum sulfide), pentlandite (nickel sulfide), realgar (arsenic sulfide), and  stibnite (antimony), sphalerite (zinc sulfide), and  pyrite (iron disulfide), and chalcopyrite (iron-copper sulfide).

Corrosion induced by sulfide
Dissolved free sulfides (H2S, HS− and S2−) are very aggressive species for the corrosion of many metals such as steel, stainless steel, and copper. Sulfides present in aqueous solution are responsible for stress corrosion cracking (SCC) of steel, and is also known as sulfide stress cracking. Corrosion is a major concern in many industrial installations processing sulfides: sulfide ore mills, deep oil wells, pipelines transporting soured oil, Kraft paper factories.

Microbially-induced corrosion (MIC) or biogenic sulfide corrosion are also caused by sulfate reducing bacteria producing sulfide that is emitted in the air and oxidized in sulfuric acid by sulfur oxidizing bacteria. Biogenic sulfuric acid reacts with sewerage materials and most generally causes mass loss, cracking of the sewer pipes and ultimately, structural collapse. This kind of deterioration is a major process affecting sewer systems worldwide and leading to very high rehabilitation costs.

Oxidation of sulfide can also form thiosulfate an intermediate species responsible for severe problems of pitting corrosion of steel and stainless steel while the medium is also acidified by the production of sulfuric acid when oxidation is more advanced.

Organic chemistry
In organic chemistry, "sulfide" usually refers to the linkage C–S–C, although the term thioether is less ambiguous. For example, the thioether dimethyl sulfide is CH3–S–CH3. Polyphenylene sulfide (see below) has the empirical formula C6H4S.  Occasionally, the term sulfide refers to molecules containing the –SH functional group. For example, methyl sulfide can mean CH3–SH. The preferred descriptor for such SH-containing compounds is thiol or mercaptan, i.e. methanethiol, or methyl mercaptan.

Disulfides
Confusion arises from the different meanings of the term "disulfide". Molybdenum disulfide (MoS2) consists of separated sulfide centers, in association with molybdenum in the formal +4 oxidation state (that is, Mo4+ and two S2−). Dimethyldisulfide has the chemical binding CH3–S–S–CH3, whereas carbon disulfide has no S–S bond, being S=C=S (linear molecule analog to CO2). Most often in sulfur chemistry and in biochemistry, the disulfide term is commonly ascribed to the sulfur analogue of the peroxide –O–O– bond. The disulfide bond (–S–S–) plays a major role in the conformation of proteins and in the catalytic activity of enzymes.

Examples

Preparation
Sulfide compounds can be prepared in several different ways:

Direct combination of elements:
Example: Fe() + S() → FeS()
Reduction of a sulfate:
Example: MgSO4() + 4C() → MgS() + 4CO()
Precipitation of an insoluble sulfide:
Example: M2+ + H2S() → MS() + 2H+()

Safety
Many metal sulfides are so insoluble in water that they are probably not very toxic. Some metal sulfides, when exposed to a strong mineral acid, including gastric acids, will release toxic hydrogen sulfide.

Organic sulfides are highly flammable. When a sulfide burns it produces sulfur dioxide (SO2) gas.

Hydrogen sulfide, some of its salts, and almost all organic sulfides have a strong and putrid stench; rotting biomass releases these.

Nomenclature 
The systematic names sulfanediide and sulfide(2−), valid IUPAC names, are determined according to the substitutive and additive nomenclatures, respectively. However, the name sulfide is also used in compositional IUPAC nomenclature which does not take the nature of bonding involved. Examples of such naming include selenium disulfide and titanium sulfide, which contain no sulfide ions.

References

External links

Anions
Corrosion
 
Functional groups
Sulfur ions